The Gävle Goat is a traditional Christmas display erected annually at Slottstorget (Castle Square) in central Gävle, Sweden. The display is a giant version of a traditional Swedish Yule Goat figure made of straw. It is erected each year by local community groups at the beginning of Advent over a period of two days. 

The Gävle Goat has been the subject of repeated arson attacks; despite security measures and a nearby fire station, the goat has been burned to the ground most years since its first appearance in 1966. , 38 out of 57 goats have been destroyed or damaged in some way. Burning or destroying the goat in some way is illegal, and the Svea Court of Appeal has stated that the offence should normally carry a 3-month prison sentence.

Since 1986, two separate Yule Goats have been built in Gävle: the Gävle Goat by the Southern Merchants and the Yule Goat built by the Natural Science Club of the School of Vasa.

History 

The Gävle Goat is erected every year on the first day of Advent, which according to Western Christian tradition is in late November or early December, depending on the calendar year. In 1966, an advertising consultant, Stig Gavlén (1927–2018), came up with the idea of making a giant version of the traditional Swedish Yule Goat and placing it in the square. The design of the first goat was assigned to the then chief of the Gävle fire department, Gavlén's brother Jörgen Gavlén. The construction of the goat was carried out by the fire department, and they erected the goat each year from 1966 to 1970 and from 1986 to 2002. The first goat was financed by Harry Ström. On New Year's Eve, the goat was burnt down, and the perpetrator was found and convicted of vandalism. The goat was insured, and Ström got all of his money back.

A group of businessmen known as the Southern Merchants financed the building of the goat in subsequent years. In 1971, the Southern Merchants stopped building the goats. The Natural Science Club of the School of Vasa began building the structure. Due to the positive reaction their Yule Goat received that year, they built another one the following year and from then on. The Southern Merchants began building their own goats again in 1986.

The cost for the 1966 goat was 10,000 Swedish kronor (SEK). The price tag for constructing the goat in 2005 was around SEK 100,000. The city pays one-third of the cost while the Southern Merchants pay the remaining sum. Since 2003 the construction of the goat has been undertaken by a group of unemployed people known as ALU workers.

The display has become notable for being a recurring target for vandalism by arson, and has been destroyed many times since the first goat was erected in 1966. Because the fire station is close to the location of the goat, most of the time the fire can be extinguished before the wooden skeleton is severely damaged. If the goat is burned down before 13 December, the feast day of Saint Lucia, the goat is rebuilt. The skeleton is then treated and repaired, and the goat reconstructed over it, using straw which the Goat Committee has pre-ordered. As of 2005, four people have been caught or convicted for vandalizing the goat. In 2001, the goat was burned down by a 51-year-old American visitor from Cleveland, Ohio, who spent 18 days in jail and was subsequently convicted and ordered to pay SEK 100,000 (US$) in damages. The court confiscated his cigarette lighter with the argument that he clearly was not able to handle it. He stated in court that he was no "goat burner", and believed that he was taking part in a completely legal goat-burning tradition. After he was released from jail he returned to the US without paying his fine.

In 1996, the Southern Merchants introduced camera surveillance to monitor the goat 24 hours a day. On 27 November 2004 the Gävle Goat's homepage was hacked, and one of the two official webcams changed. One year, while security guards were posted around the goat in order to prevent further vandalism, the temperature dropped far below zero. As the guards ducked into a nearby restaurant to escape the cold, the vandals struck.

During the weekend of 3–4 December 2005, a series of attacks on public Yule Goats across Sweden were carried out; the Gävle Goat was burnt on 3 December. The Visby goat on Gotland burned down, the Yule Goat in Söderköping, Östergötland was torched, and there was an attack on a goat located in Lycksele, Västerbotten. 
   
The Christmas season of 2006 marked the 40th anniversary of the Gävle Goat, and, on Sunday 3 December, the city held a large celebration in honor of the goat. The Goat Committee fireproofed the goat with "Fiber ProTector Fireproof", a fireproofing substance that is used in airplanes. In earlier years when the goat had been fireproofed, the dew had made the liquid drip off the goat. To prevent this from happening in 2006, "Fireproof ProTechtor Solvent Base" was applied to the goat. Despite their efforts, the goat has been damaged or destroyed a total of 38 times. On 27 November 2016 an arsonist equipped with petrol burned it down just hours after its inauguration.  After a few flame-free years under 24-hour security, the goat was again burned on 17 December 2021.

Natural Science Club's Yule Goat

Since 1986 there have been two Yule Goats built in Gävle: the Gävle Goat by the Southern Merchants and the Yule Goat built by the Natural Science Club of the School of Vasa. The creator of the original 1966 goat, Stig Gavlén, thought that the Natural Science Club's goat had unfairly won the title of the largest Yule Goat because the goat was not as attractive as the Southern Merchants' goat and the neck was excessively long. The next year there was a Goat war: the Southern Merchants understood the publicity value, and erected a huge goat, the Natural Science Club erected a smaller one in protest. The Southern Merchants had intended that their huge goat would reclaim the world record, but the measurement of the goat showed it fell short. Over the following seven years there were no further attempts on the world record, but there was some hostility between the Natural Science Club and the Southern Merchants, evidenced by the fact that the Natural Science Club put up a sign near their goat wishing a Merry Christmas to everyone, except the Southern Merchants.

In 1993 the Southern Merchants again announced that they were going to attempt the world record. The goat stood  when completed. The Natural Science Club's Yule Goat that year measured , which earned them another place in the Guinness Book of Records.

Timeline

1966–1969

1970–1979

1980–1989

1990–1999

2000–2009

2010–2019

2020–current

See also
Garden gnome liberationists
Wicker man

References

External links

Gävle goat webcam
Gävle goat blog
Gävle goat history 

Swedish culture
Swedish folklore
Gävle
Christmas in Sweden
Christmas characters
Straw art
Buildings and structures in Gävleborg County
Vandalized works of art in Sweden
Arson in Sweden